Adolf Klügmann (12 May 1837 – 27 November 1880) was a German classical archaeologist and numismatist born in Lübeck.

He was a pupil to Otto Jahn (1813–1869) at the University of Bonn, then continued his studies at the Universities of Berlin and Göttingen. Due to poor health, from 1861 onward, he spent almost his entire life in Rome.

From 1873, he worked as an unpaid librarian at the Deutsches Archäologisches Institut in Rome.  In 1878 he was editor of the "Corpus Speculorum Etruscorum" (project to publish all existing Etruscan bronze mirrors), a project begun by Eduard Gerhard (1795–1867), and after Klügmann's death, continued by Gustav Körte (1852–1917).

In addition to the Etruscan mirrors, Klügmann performed research in the fields of Roman numismatics, ancient mythology (particularly Amazons) and Greek vase painting.

Written works 
 Die Amazonen in der attischen Literatur und Kunst. (The Amazons in Athenian literature and art) Eine archaeologische Abhandlung, 1875.
 Etruskische Spiegel. (Etruscan mirror) Volume 5, Reimer, Berlin 1897.

References 
 This page is based on translation of an equivalent article at the German Wikipedia, sources including: Biographisches Jahrbuch für Altertumskunde 3, 1880, S. 82–85.

German librarians
Archaeologists from Lübeck
University of Bonn alumni
Classical archaeologists
German numismatists
1837 births
1880 deaths
Burials in the Protestant Cemetery, Rome